The Cipriani College of Labour and Cooperative Studies (CCLCS) is a public university located in Trinidad and Tobago. The CCLCS was established in 1966 and its main campus is located in Valsayn but there are satellite locations in San Fernando and Tobago. The college is named in honor of the labour leader Arthur Andrew Cipriani.

History 
CCLCS was initially established to provide trade union training and worker education, conduct seminars and courses and other related activities in the field of Industrial Relations and to undertake research in Labour issues and problems. The Cipriani Labour College Act, No.4 of 1972, provides the legal framework for the functioning of the College. Over the period of time the curriculum  has expanded to cover  areas such as Co-operative Studies, Occupational Safety and Health, Human Resource Management, Project Management, Environmental Management, Security Administration and Management, and Emergency Management. CCLCS is accredited by Accreditation Council of Trinidad and Tobago (ACTT)

References

External links 
 

Educational institutions established in 1966
Universities in Trinidad and Tobago
1966 establishments in North America